Adnan Barakat (born 3 September 1982) is a Dutch former professional footballer who played as a right winger for Dutch sides Ajax Amsterdam, NAC Breda, FC Eindhoven, Cambuur Leeuwarden, FK Baku, FC Den Bosch and Muangthong United among others.

Career
Barakat signed for Azerbaijan Premier League side FK Baku in January 2010 on a 2.5-year contract. He made his debut for Baku on 2 February 2010 in their 2–1 home victory over Turan Tovuz,  with his first goal for Baku coming the following season on 6 November 2010 in their 3–1 away win over Ganja.

He won the cup of Azerbaijan, and played Europe League that year and the years he played at NAC Breda. He worked with some big coaches in his career so far like Henk Ten Cate, Co Adriaanse, Bülent Korkmaz, Winfried Schäfer, Aleksandrs Starkovs also coach of the national team of Latvia and now Slaviša Jokanović former Chelsea player. Last season he won the Premier League title of Thailand with Muang Thong United and he played a big role in it.

In November 2011 Barakat left Baku having not been paid for months.
After leaving Baku, Barakat signed for Muangthong United in January 2012, but was unable to play for them straight away due to his dispute with Baku, and the club withholding his registration. He left Muangthong United in July 2013.

In February 2014, Barakat moved to another Thai Premier League, Songkhla United.

Career statistics

Honours
FK Baku
 Azerbaijan Cup: 2009–10

Muangthong United
Thai Premier League: 2012

References

External links

1982 births
Living people
Footballers from Amsterdam
Dutch footballers
Association football wingers
Eredivisie players
Eerste Divisie players
Adnan Barakat
Adnan Barakat
NAC Breda players
FC Eindhoven players
SC Cambuur players
FC Den Bosch players
FC Baku players
Adnan Barakat
Adnan Barakat
Adnan Barakat
Adnan Barakat
OFC Oostzaan players
Dutch expatriate footballers
Dutch expatriate sportspeople in Azerbaijan
Expatriate footballers in Azerbaijan
Dutch expatriate sportspeople in Thailand
Expatriate footballers in Thailand